Monica Seles was the defending champion, but chose not to participate. Steffi Graf won the title, defeating Arantxa Sánchez Vicario in the finals, 6–3, 4–6, 7–6(8–6).

Seeds 
The top eight seeds received a bye to the second round.

Draw

Finals

Top half

Section 1

Section 2

Bottom half

Section 1

Section 2

References

External links 
 ITF tournament edition details

Lufthansa Cup
WTA German Open
1991 in German tennis